Fortaleza Esporte Clube, usually known as Fortaleza, is primarily a football club, but is active in other sports such as futsal, handball and basketball. Fortaleza Esporte Clube is based in Fortaleza, capital of the State of Ceará, Brazil. The club was founded on October 18, 1918.

Fortaleza is one of the most traditional clubs in the Northeastern region of Brazil alongside Bahia, Vitória, Santa Cruz, Sport, Náutico and Ceará, its biggest rival. The club's colors are red, blue and white.

History 
On 23 February 1912, Alcides Santos founded a club called Fortaleza, and participated shortly after in the founding of the Stella Foot-Ball Club. Finally, on 18 October 1918, Fortaleza Sporting Club was born, the first denomination of the Fortaleza Esporte Clube. Its colors represent the colors of the French flag, since the founder spent time in France and decided to put the colors of the European country in the Brazilian club.

In 1920, they participated in the foundation of the Associação Cearense de Desportos. That same year they got their first Cearense Championship title.

In 1951, the Municipality of Fortaleza decided to renovate the Presidente Vargas Stadium. The idea of having a private stadium was reborn in the board  since it had its own stadium during the 1920s.

In 1957, the club acquired from the land in Bairro do Pici from Mrs. Hedwing, which during the Second World War was where the American military base was in Fortaleza, called Post Command ( Command Post), hence the name Pici, transfers it to the Club of Gentilândia in exchange for the new neighborhood. It changed its name to Leão do Pici, a reference to the neighborhood where the Parque dos Campeonatos is located.

The Alcides Santos Stadium opened its doors in June 1962, beating Usina Ceará in the inaugural match.

After finishing in 4th place in the 2021 Campeonato Brasileiro Série A, the club qualified for the Copa Libertadores for the first time in history.

Uniform 

 Home Uniform: Blue and red shirt with blue pants and white socks.
 Away uniform: White and blue shirt with blue pants and blue socks.

Uniform Evolution

Statistics
Campeonato Brasileiro Série A
 Player with most goals scored: Rinaldo (23 goals)
 Player with most goals scored in a single tournament: Rinaldo (16 goals), in 2005
All divisions taken in consideration
 Player with most goals scored: Rinaldo (43 goals); in 2004 (14), 2005 (16), 2006 (11) and 2008 (2)
Topscorers in national competitions (cups and leagues)
 Bececê (7 goals), Taça Brasil 1960
 Rinaldo (14 goals), Campeonato Brasileiro Série B 2004
Best Série A right-back (Bola de Prata award): Louro, in 1974

Mascot

In the 1960s a journalist popularized the Leão, a name that came from the times of Praça dos Leões. The mascot's name is Juba.

Club structure

Headquarters 
The Fortaleza Esporte Clube has its headquarters in the district of Pici, which consists of the Manoel Guimarães administrative headquarters, stadium Alcides Santos stadium, indoor trophies, Hotel Ribamar Bezerra (used for athletes), Otoni Diniz accommodation, dressing rooms, fitness center, and a modern medical department.

Stadiums
They play their games at Alcides Santos Stadium, with capacity for 8,300 people,  Estadio Castelão, which can hold 63,903 supporters and Estádio Presidente Vargas, which has a capacity of 20,600.

Past presidents
Alcides Santos
João Gentil
João César
Ney Rebouças
Aírton França Rebouças
Péricles Mulatinho
José Atanásio dos Santos
José Nestor Falcão
Osvaldo Azim
Ezequiel Menezes
Jorge Mota (1999—03)
Clayton Alcântara Veras (2004)
Ribamar Bezerra (2005—06)
Marcello Desidério (2007—08)
Lúcio Bonfim (2008—09)
Renan Vieira (2010)
Paulo Arthur Magalhães (2011)
Osmar Baquit (2011—14)
Jorge Mota (2015—17)
Luis Eduardo Girão (2017)
Marcelo Paz (2017—present)

Current squad

Reserve team

Out on loan

Staff

Current staff

Honours
 Campeonato Brasileiro Série B
 Winners (1): 2018

 Copa do Nordeste
 Winners (2): 2019, 2022

 Torneio Norte-Nordeste
 Winners (1): 1970

 Campeonato Cearense
 Winners (45): 1920, 1921, 1923, 1924, 1926, 1927, 1928, 1933, 1934, 1937, 1938, 1946, 1947, 1949, 1953, 1954, 1959, 1960, 1964, 1965, 1967, 1969, 1973, 1974, 1982, 1983, 1985, 1987, 1991, 1992, 2000, 2001, 2003, 2004, 2005, 2007, 2008, 2009, 2010, 2015, 2016, 2019, 2020, 2021, 2022

 Copa dos Campeões Cearenses
 Winners (2): 2016, 2017

References

External links
Official Website
Fan Online Community
Site with News related to Fortaleza Esporte Clube

Fortaleza Esporte Clube
Sports clubs established in 1918
Association football clubs established in 1918
1918 establishments in Brazil
Torneio Norte-Nordeste winners